A warehouse management system (WMS) is a set of policies and processes intended to organise the work of a warehouse or distribution centre, and ensure that such a facility can operate efficiently and meet its objectives.

In the 20th century the term 'warehouse management information system' was often used to distinguish software that fulfils this function from theoretical systems. Some smaller facilities may use spreadsheets or physical media like pen and paper to document their processes and activities, and this too can be considered a WMS. However, in contemporary usage, the term overwhelmingly refers to computer systems.

The core function of a warehouse management system is to record the arrival and departure of inventory. From that starting point, features are added like recording the precise location of stock within the warehouse, optimising the use of available space, or coordinating tasks for maximum efficiency.

Levels of Complexity 

More complex warehouse management systems tend to include specialised features designed for specific industries or types of facility, while legacy enterprise software vendors aim to offer as many of these features as possible in a ‘one-size-fits-all’ solution, which may be available as modules.

Academic research has made use of an approximate classification system based on 3 levels of complexity:

 A basic WMS supports inventory management and location control. The performance data that can be produced at this level is generally limited to ‘throughput’, i.e.: how much stock moves through the warehouse in a given period of time. A basic WMS is almost indistinguishable from a basic Inventory Management System.
 An advanced WMS can analyse capacity and stock levels, and perhaps track how much time and labour is spent on different activities. This allows it to generate data that measures efficiency and suggest ways to improve it. Outside of East Asia, Most WMS's in use today fall into this category. At this level, the duties of the WMS may begin to overlap with or supersede those of a Warehouse Control System or Warehouse Execution System.
 A controlled WMS can exchange data with other systems, in order to take into account information from outside the warehouse (e.g.: manufacturing needs, customer orders, transportation) when planning activities, and vice versa. It may control or obtain feedback from automation or IoT devices, in facilities that have them. It may also continuously simulate or test strategies for improving operations, perhaps using machine learning. The most complex WMS's are almost indistinguishable from the most complex WES's.

Types of Installation and Licensing 

WMS software has historically been offered through a perpetual licence, giving organisations the permanent right to install it on their own on-premise servers, typically alongside a fixed period of updates and technical support which may be renewed at additional cost.

As with many types of enterprise software, this provision model is gradually being replaced by hosted subscription services. Legacy enterprise software vendors typically offer both models, but incentivise their customers to move to the cloud.

A WMS may be a standalone product, or can be a module or category of modules within a larger Enterprise Resource Planning (ERP) system or Supply Chain Management System (SCMS).

Installation type does not affect the level of functionality that may be achieved by a WMS, so long as sufficient computing power is provisioned and data is successfully synchronised with other systems.

Comparison with Other Software Packages 
Inventory Management Software is used in many industries, such as manufacturing, retail and hospitality. Like warehouse management systems, its foundational feature is tracking stock levels of different materials. These two types of software begin to differ at more advanced levels. For example, a service business with a relatively simple ‘warehouse’ or storeroom is more likely to require features that analyse the cost of materials it consumes, or the optimal moment to purchase additional stock, rather than complex WMS features that focus on efficient movement of material within the warehouse itself.

Many Enterprise Resource Planning systems include a warehouse management module or set of modules. The core logic of an ERP system is transactional in nature; its purpose is to connect operational and commercial data to accounting and financial decision-making. As a result, its warehouse modules tend to focus on the metrics that are immediately and obviously relevant from a financial point of view, and tend to lack the sophistication of advanced WMS's.

Integrated Supply Chain Management software packages tend to bring together warehouse management with transportation management and additional functionality. Unlike ERP systems, these systems usually focus on operational needs. However, like ERP systems they tend to lack the depth and configurability of a specialised WMS.

The terms Warehouse Control and Warehouse Execution systems are sometimes used interchangeably with each other and with warehouse management systems. However, a WCS traditionally manages motorised equipment such as conveyor belts, as may be found in facilities handling high-volume, low-variety materials. As automation equipment has grown more sophisticated, it has been employed in more complex facilities, giving rise to WES nomenclature for systems that integrate advanced controls and WMS capabilities. As more features are added to each side, the distinction between a high-end WES and WMS blurs.

Yard Management Software is generally aimed at large facilities and organisations that manage their own transport fleet. It can be a standalone system, or a module of a WMS or SCMS. In terms of functionality, a YMS may track an inventory of vehicles, parking spaces and resources, coordinate the movement of full and empty trailers, or manage appointments in order to better predict workload.

Dock Scheduling may be available as a component of a YMS, SCMS or WMS, but usually with a low level of sophistication. Standalone dock scheduling software more frequently includes features that acquire data about incoming loads in advance, or restrict carriers to specific time slots or durations.

Market 

According to a report by Grand View Research, “The global warehouse management system market size is expected to grow from US$2.8 billion in 2021 to $6.1 billion by 2026, at a compound annual growth rate of 16.7%.”

The authors of Warehouse Science note that “there are over 300 WMS vendors in the US alone. The largest companies hold less than 20% of the market.”

Limitations 
Edward Frazelle, the founding director of Georgia Tech Supply Chain and Logistics Institute, argues that while the demands on warehouses are increasing in an increasingly competitive global marketplace, “warehouses today have... less warehouse management system capability (a by-product of Y2K investments in enterprise resource planning systems)”

Researchers from the Business School at Erasmus University Rotterdam in the Netherlands have pointed out that “a standard WMS remains largely making compromises between the way a warehouse wants to work and the way the system allows the warehouse to work. In certain environments, such compromises might seriously degrade warehouse performance.”

Many researchers and analysts have pointed out that receiving operations, which account for about 17% of warehouse operating costs, are a particular area where contemporary warehouse management systems tend to fall short, particularly insofar as pre-scheduling and communications with external carriers, customers and suppliers represents a bottleneck.

Software vendors have suggested that “In cases where moving away from a legacy WMS is not possible, its shortcomings can still be addressed by smart integrations, earning the warehouse breathing room in the medium-term.”

References

Why temperature loggers are needed for warehouse monitoring?

Further reading
 Fayol Henri, General and Industrial Management, 2013 translated reprint, 
 Gattorna, John (2015), Dynamic Supply Chains 

Warehouses
Business software
Automatic identification and data capture
Radio-frequency identification
Logistics
Supply chain management
Management cybernetics